Tufa is a variety of limestone formed when carbonate minerals precipitate out of water in unheated rivers or lakes. Geothermally heated hot springs sometimes produce similar (but less porous) carbonate deposits, which are known as travertine. Tufa is sometimes referred to as (meteogene) travertine.  It should not be confused with hot spring (thermogene) travertine. Tufa, which is calcareous, should also not be confused with tuff, a porous volcanic rock with a similar etymology that is sometimes also called "tufa".

Classification and features
Modern and fossil tufa deposits abound with wetland plants; as such, many tufa deposits are characterised by their large macrobiological component, and are highly porous. Tufa forms either in fluvial channels or in lacustrine environments. Ford and Pedley (1996) provide a review of tufa systems worldwide.

Fluvial deposits
Deposits can be classified by their depositional environment (or otherwise by vegetation or petrographically). Pedley (1990) provides an extensive classification system, which includes the following classes of fluvial tufa:
Spring – Deposits form on emergence from a spring/seep. Morphology can vary from mineratrophic wetlands to spring aprons (see calcareous sinter)
Braided channel – Deposits form within a fluvial channel, dominated by oncoids (see oncolite)
Cascade – Deposits form at waterfalls, deposition is focused here due to accelerated flow (see Geochemistry)
Barrage – Deposits form as a series of phytoherm barrages across a channel, which may grow up to several metres in height. Barrages often contain a significant detrital component, composed of organic material (leaf litter, branches etc.).

Lacustrine deposits
Lacustrine tufas are generally formed at the periphery of lakes and built-up phytoherms (freshwater reefs), and on stromatolites. Oncoids are also common in these environments.

Calcareous sinter
Although sometimes regarded as a distinct carbonate deposit, calcareous sinter formed from ambient temperature water can be considered a sub-type of tufa.

Speleothems
Calcareous speleothems may be regarded as a form of calcareous sinter. They lack any significant macrophyte component due to the absence of light, and for this reason they are often morphologically closer to travertine or calcareous sinter.

Columns
Tufa columns are an unusual form of tufa typically associated with saline lakes. They are distinct from most tufa deposits in that they lack any significant macrophyte component, due to the salinity excluding mesophilic organisms. Some tufa columns may actually form from hot-springs, and may therefore constitute a form of travertine. It is generally thought that such features form from CaCO3 precipitated when carbonate rich source waters emerge into alkaline soda lakes.

Biology
Tufa deposits form an important habitat for a diverse flora. Bryophytes (mosses, liverworts etc.) and diatoms are well represented. The porosity of the deposits creates a wet habitat ideal for these plants.

Geochemistry
Modern tufa is formed from alkaline waters, supersaturated with calcite. On emergence, waters degas CO2 due to the lower atmospheric CO2 (see partial pressure), resulting in an increase in pH. Since carbonate solubility decreases with increased pH, precipitation is induced. Supersaturation may be enhanced by factors leading to a reduction in CO2, for example increased air-water interactions at waterfalls may be important, as may photosynthesis.

Recently it has been demonstrated that microbially induced precipitation may be more important than physico-chemical precipitation. Pedley et al. (2009) showed with flume experiments that precipitation does not occur unless a biofilm is present, despite supersaturation.

Calcite is the dominant mineral precipitate, followed by the polymorph aragonite.

Occurrence
Tufa is common in many parts of the world, including::
Pyramid Lake, Nevada, US – tufa formations
Big Soda Lake, Nevada, US – tufa formations only a century old
Mono Lake, California, US – tufa columns
Trona Pinnacles, California, US – tufa columns
Matlock Bath, Derbyshire, United Kingdom
North Dock Tufa, United Kingdom
Plitvice Lakes National Park, Croatia
Basturs Lakes, Pallars Jussà, Catalonia - tufa mounds
Various parts of Armenia, such as Artik
The southwestern coastline of Western Australia
The Madikwe Game Reserve in the North West Province, South Africa
The Kadishi Tufa, Blyde River Canyon, Mpumalanga Province, South Africa

Some sources suggest that "tufa" was used as the primary building material for most of the châteaux of the Loire Valley, France. This results from a mis-translation of the terms "tuffeau jaune" and "tuffeau blanc", which are porous varieties of the Late Cretaceous marine limestone known as chalk.

Uses
Tufa is occasionally shaped into a planter. Its porous consistency makes it ideal for alpine gardens. A concrete mixture called hypertufa is used for similar purposes.

See also

References

External links

Mono Lake Committee: "Tufa"